Second to Last Love is a South Korean television series starring Kim Hee-ae, Ji Jin-hee and Kwak Si-yang. It is a Korean drama remake of the Japanese television drama series Saigo Kara Nibanme no Koi which aired on Fuji TV from 2012 to 2014. It replaced Beautiful Gong Shim and aired on SBS on Saturdays and Sundays at 22:00 (KST) for 20 episodes from July 30 to October 16, 2016.

Cast

Main cast
 Kim Hee-ae as Kang Min-joo
A 46-year-old woman, she is a SBC Broadcasting's executive producer and the leader of drama division's team 1.
 Ji Jin-hee as Go Sang-sik
A 46-year-old man, he is a grade 5 official and the head of Woori City Hall's regional tourism section.
 Kwak Si-yang as Park Joon-woo
A 35-year-old man, he is the owner of healing cafe "Rest".

Go Sang-sik's family
 Kim Seul-gi as Go Mi-rye
A 35-year-old woman, she is Sang-sik youngest sister and an unknown webtoon writer.
 Jung Soo-young as Go Sang-hee
A 42-year-old woman, she is Sang-sik's first younger sister and Cheon-soo's wife.
 Lee Soo-min as Go Ye-ji
A 15-year-old girl, she is Sang-sik's only daughter.
 Lee Hyung-chul as Park Cheon-soo
A 45-year-old man, he is Sang-sik's brother-in-law, Sang-hee's husband and a middle school's math teacher.
  as Park Hoon
An 18-year-old boy, he is Sang-sik's nephew, Sang-hee and Cheon-soo's only son.
 Sung Ji-ru as Dok Go-bong
A 62-year-old man, he is owner of the bar where Sang-sik is a customer.
 Stephanie Lee as Min Ji-seon 
A 29-year-old woman, she is a Canadian-born Korean model.

Kang Min-joo's friends
 Kim Na-young as Shin Ae-kyung
A 46-year-old woman, she is Min-joo's friend and a 2nd year divorced woman.
 Seo Jeong-yeon as Goo Tae-yeon
A 46-year-old woman, she is Min-joo's friend, a single lady, and a writing teacher.

People of Woori City Hall
 Moon Hee-kyung as Na Choon-woo
A 55-year-old woman, she is the Deputy Mayor.
 Kim Kwon as Cha Soo-hyuk
A 35-year-old man, he is a grade 7 official and a competent of the regional tourism section.
 Go Bo-gyeol as Han Song-yi
A 28-year-old woman, she is a female contract employee of the regional tourism section.
  as Shin Seok-gi
A 43-year-old man, he is the Economic and Cultural director.

SBC Broadcasting Bureau
  as Han Jeong-sik
A 49-year-old man, he is an executive producer and the leader of drama division's team 2.
  as Gook Young-soo
A 52-year-old man, he is the head of drama division.
  as Oh Young-ae
A 43-year-old woman, she is the production PD of drama division and Min-joo's right arm.
  as Nam Gi-cheol
A 35-year-old man, he is a 5th year assistant director and Min-joo's left arm
  as Na Ae-ri
A 33-year-old woman, she is a new drama writer.
  as PD

Extended cast
 Jung Yoo-an as Kim Hyun-seok
 
 Seo Yang-won
 Kwon Eun-soo as Miss Kim
 
 
 Choi Yoon-joon
  as writer Hwang
 
 Lee Hyun-jin as Jang Eun-ho
  as teacher Ma
 
 
  as Na Joo-yeon
 Bang Eun-hee

Cameo appearances
 Go Doo-shim as Kang Min-joo's mother
 Yoon Joo-sang as Kang Min-joo's father

Ratings

In the table below, the blue numbers represent the lowest ratings and the red numbers represent the highest ratings.

Notes
Episode 3 wasn't aired on Saturday August 6 due to broadcast of the 2016 Summer Olympics in Rio de Janeiro, Brazil. This episode was aired on Sunday August 7, 2016.
Episode 4 wasn't aired on Saturday August 13 due to broadcast of the 2016 Summer Olympics in Rio de Janeiro, Brazil. This episode was aired on Sunday August 14, 2016.
Episode 5 wasn't aired on Saturday August 20 due to broadcast of the 2016 Summer Olympics in Rio de Janeiro, Brazil. This episode was aired on Sunday August 21, 2016.
Episode 12 wasn't aired on September 17 and 18 due to broadcast of Assassination and The Beauty Inside in the SBS's Chuseok programs. This episode was aired on Saturday September 24, 2016.
Two episodes 18 and 19 were aired consecutively on Saturday October 15.

Original soundtrack

Part 1

Part 2

Part 3

Part 4

Part 5

Part 6

Part 7

Awards and nominations

References

External links
  
 Second to Last Love at Naver Movies 
 
 

2016 South Korean television series debuts
2016 South Korean television series endings
Seoul Broadcasting System television dramas
Korean-language television shows
South Korean romance television series
Saigo Kara Nibanme no Koi